Prastio is an abandoned Turkish Cypriot village located in the Paphos District of Cyprus, on the Diarizos river northeast of Paphos.

References

Communities in Paphos District